This is a list of Kyoto Prize winners, awarded annually by the Inamori Foundation.

Basic sciences
Source: Kyoto Prize

Advanced technology
Source: Kyoto Prize

Arts and philosophy
Source: Kyoto Prize

See also
 The Kyoto Prize in Advanced Technology
 The Kyoto Prize in Basic Sciences
 The Kyoto Prize in Arts and Philosophy
 The Kyoto Prize

Notes

References

Japanese science and technology awards
Kyoto Prize winners
Kyoto Prize winners
Kyoto Prize

ru:Премия Киото